The Gevalia Open was a golf tournament held at Gävle Golf Club in Gävle, Sweden from 1978. It featured on the Swedish Golf Tour from its inception in 1984 and on the Challenge Tour in 1990 and 1991. It was re-named the Gefle Open in 1991, using the archaic spelling of Gävle.

In 2011 European Tour winner Peter Hedblom, the most successful player to represent Gävle Golf Club, hosted the tournament. The years 1999–2004 and 2006–2007 the club hosted the Gefle Ladies Open instead, on the women's Swedish Golf Tour.

Winners

Notes

References

External links
Coverage on the Challenge Tour's official site

Former Challenge Tour events
Swedish Golf Tour events
Golf tournaments in Sweden